Frankie J. Galasso is an American musician and actor. He is best known as member of the boy band Dream Street.

Early life
Galasso attended Salesian High School in New Rochelle, New York, and Five Towns College.

Career
Galasso's career began in 1995 when he starred as Mickey Canetti in Hudson Street. In 1997, he played the role of Andrew Kempster in the movie Jungle 2 Jungle. He provided the singing voice of Christopher Robin in Pooh's Grand Adventure: The Search for Christopher Robin (1997), A Winnie the Pooh Thanksgiving (1998), and Winnie the Pooh: A Valentine for You (1999). In 2003, Galasso portrayed Tommy in the movie A Tale of Two Pizzas.

In 2008 Galasso began recording new songs, releasing his single "Give Me a Reason" on March 19, 2009.

In 2012, Galasso was an ensemble cast member of the First National Touring of Jersey Boys.

In January 2014, Galasso and Alissa Salvatore recorded a cover of "Say Something".

In September 2016, Galasso performed the National Anthem at Broncos Stadium before a Bengals vs. Broncos game and at Coors Field before a Rockies vs. Cardinals game.

On June 2, 2020, Galasso's former Dream Street bandmate Chris Trousdale died at a hospital in Burbank, California, at the age of 34 due to complications from an unknown illness during the COVID-19 pandemic in California. It was later revealed that COVID-19 was the main complication of Trousdale's death. On June 11, 2020, on what would be Trousdale's 35th birthday, Galasso and his former Dream Street bandmates Greg Raposo, Jesse McCartney, and Matt Ballinger reunited for a virtual performance of "It Happens Every Time" to pay tribute to Trousdale. This would be the first public appearance of Dream Street together as a group since the disbandment over the lawsuits prior.

Personal life
Galasso has been in a relationship with broadway actress Kara Tremel since September 10, 2012.

Discography
Albums
2001: Dream Street 
2002: The Biggest Fan 
Singles
2001: It Happens Every Time 
2001: I Say Yeah 
2002: With All My Heart

Filmography

References

External links

Frankie J. Galasso on Myspace

American male child actors
American child singers
American male film actors
American male pop singers
American male television actors
Place of birth missing (living people)
Dream Street members
Living people
1985 births
21st-century American singers
21st-century American male singers